was a two-year college located in Fukuchiyama, Kyoto, Japan. Discontinued in 2017.

Seibi University Junior College is a part of the Seibi Gakuen school system which also includes Seibi High School and Seibi University. The college offers hospitality and nutrition courses.

External links
  

Schools in Japan